Chapter IV of the Constitution of Australia pertains to trade (including between states and between the states and the Commonwealth), the appropriation of funds for the Commonwealth, state debts, and funds for the states given to them by the Commonwealth. Much of it no longer applies.

Sections
There are 25 sections to Chapter IV, and one subsection:

 Section 81: Consolidated Revenue Fund
 Section 82: Expenditure charged thereon
 Section 83: Money to be appropriated by law
 Section 84: Transfer of officers
 Section 85: Transfer of property of State
 Section 86: Customs, excise, and bounties
 Section 87: Revenue from customs and excise duties
 Section 88: Uniform duties of customs
 Section 89: Payment to States before uniform duties
 Section 90: Exclusive power over customs, excise, and bounties
 Section 91: Exceptions as to bounties
 Section 92: Trade within the Commonwealth to be free
 Section 93: Payment to States for five years after uniform tariffs
 Section 94: Distribution of surplus
 Section 95: Customs duties of Western Australia
 Section 96: Financial assistance to States
 Section 97: Audit
 Section 98: Trade and commerce includes navigation and State railways
 Section 99: Commonwealth not to give preference
 Section 100: Nor abridge right to use water
 Section 101: Inter-State Commission
 Section 102: Parliament may forbid preferences by State
 Section 103: Commissioners' appointment, tenure, and remuneration
 Section 104: Saving of certain rates
 Section 105: Taking over public debts of States
 Section 105A: Agreements with respect to State debts

Reference list

Australian constitutional law